Chourai is a town and a nagar panchayat in Chhindwara district  in the state of Madhya Pradesh, India.

Geography
The National Highway 347 runs through the town.

Demographics
 India census, Chaurai Khas had a population of 11,399. Males constitute 52% of the population and females 48%. Chaurai Khas has an average literacy rate of 69%, higher than the national average of 59.5%; with male literacy of 74% and female literacy of 63%. 13% of the population is under 6 years of age.

Attractions 
Machagora Dam is 15.2 KM from Chourai.
Shasthi Mata Mandir Kapurda is 10.4 KM from Chourai.

References

Cities and towns in Chhindwara district